Tandem means an arrangement one behind another as opposed to side by side.

Tandem may also refer to:

Companies
Tandem Computers, a former manufacturer of fault-tolerant computer systems
Tandem Diabetes Care, insulin infusion therapy manufacturer for the treatment of diabetes
Tandem Money Limited, a British finance company
Tandem Bank, previously Harrods Bank
Tandem, a language exchange app

Entertainment
Tandem (1987 film), a 1987 French dramatic road movie directed by Patrice Leconte 
Tandem (TV series), a 2018 Armenian sitcom
Tandem Productions, a former American television production company
Tandem Publishing Co, see Universal-Tandem Publishing Co Ltd, a former publishing company in the UK
Tandem Verlag, a German publishing company, founded 1994
"Tandem" (song), a 1990 song by Vanessa Paradis from the album Variations sur le même t'aime

Sport
Tandem (UCI), a para-cycling classification for visually impaired cyclists who require a sighted pilot

Technology
Air Command Tandem, an American gyroplane design
TandEM, a space project to explore Saturn's moons Titan and Enceladus
Tandem accelerator, see Particle accelerator
Tandem bicycle
Tandem carriage
Tandem-charge, an explosive device or projectile that has two or more stages of detonation
Tandem cell, a type of solar cell
Tandem language learning, a method of language learning
Tandem mass spectrometry, see Mass spectrometry
Tandem repeat, a pattern of adjacent repetitions of nucleotides in DNA
Tandem rotors
Tandem signaling
Tandem single-chain variable fragment, a type of pharmaceutical drug
Tandem skydiving
Tandem switch for telephone exchanges without telephones
Tandem wing, a kind of aircraft

See also
Putin-Medvedev tandemocracy